Utricularia pentadactyla is a small annual carnivorous plant that belongs to the genus Utricularia. It is native to tropical Africa, where it can be found in Angola, Burundi, the Democratic Republic of the Congo, Ethiopia, Kenya, Malawi, Sudan, Tanzania, Uganda, Zambia, and Zimbabwe. It was originally described and published by Peter Taylor in 1954, the first Utricularia species described by Taylor.

See also 
 List of Utricularia species

References 

Carnivorous plants of Africa
Flora of Angola
Flora of Burundi
Flora of Ethiopia
Flora of Kenya
Flora of Malawi
Flora of Sudan
Flora of Tanzania
Flora of the Democratic Republic of the Congo
Flora of Uganda
Flora of Zambia
Flora of Zimbabwe
pentadactyla